Lepidodes is a genus of moths of the family Erebidae. The genus was erected by Achille Guenée in 1852.

Species
Lepidodes limbulata Guenée, 1852
Lepidodes limicola Dognin, 1912
Lepidodes pectinata Schaus, 1904

References

Calpinae